The BFG (short for The Big Friendly Giant) is a 1982 children's book written by British novelist Roald Dahl and illustrated by Quentin Blake. It is an expansion of a short story from Dahl's 1975 book Danny, the Champion of the World. The book is dedicated to Dahl's late daughter, Olivia, who died of measles encephalitis at the age of seven in 1962.

An animated adaptation was released in 1989 with David Jason providing the voice of the BFG and Amanda Root as the voice of Sophie. It has also been adapted as a theatre performance. A theatrical Disney live-action adaptation directed by Steven Spielberg was released in 2016.

As of 2009, the novel has sold 37 million copies, with more than 1 million copies sold around the world every year. In 2003, The BFG was listed at number 56 in The Big Read, a BBC survey of the British public. In 2012, the novel was ranked number 88 among all-time best children's novels in a survey published by School Library Journal, a US monthly. In 2012, the BFG and Sophie appeared on Royal Mail commemorative postage stamps.

Plot
Sophie, an eight-year-old girl in an orphanage, cannot sleep. Looking out of her window, she sees a mysterious Giant Man in the street, carrying a suitcase and a trumpet. The giant sees Sophie, who tries to hide in bed, but the giant picks her up through the window. Sophie is carried to a large cave in the middle of a desolate land, where the giant sets her down. Believing that he intends to eat her, Sophie pleads for her life, but the giant laughs and dismisses the idea. He explains that although most giants do eat humans, he does not because he is the Big Friendly Giant or BFG.
The BFG explains, in a unique and messy speech, that his nine neighbors are much bigger and stronger giants, who all happily eat humans every night. They vary their choice of destination both to avoid detection and because the people's origins affect their taste. For example, people from Greece taste greasy, so no giant goes there, while people from Panama taste like hats. As he will never allow Sophie to leave in case she tells anyone of his existence, the BFG reveals the purpose of his suitcase and trumpet: he catches dreams in Dream Country, collects them in jars, and gives the good ones to children all around the world, but destroys the bad ones. Since he does not eat people, he must eat the only crop which grows on his land—the repulsive snozzcumber, which looks like a cucumber. When the Bloodbottler, one of the other giants, enters the cave, Sophie hides in the snozzcumber; not knowing this, the BFG tricks the Bloodbottler into eating the vegetable. He takes a bite of the snozzcumber; unknowingly putting Sophie in his mouth. Luckily, the larger giant spits her out and leaves in disgust. They then drink frobscottle, a delicious fizzy drink where the bubbles sink downwards rather than upwards, causing noisy flatulence, which the BFG calls "whizzpopping".

The BFG takes Sophie to Dream Country but is bullied along the way by his neighbors, led by Fleshlumpeater, the largest and strongest. Sophie watches the BFG catch two dreams—while one would be a good dream, the other is a nightmare. The BFG uses it on Fleshlumpeater, who has a dream about a giant killer named Jack and accidentally starts a brawl with his companions.

Sophie persuades the BFG to approach the Queen of England for help with the other giants. She navigates the giant to Buckingham Palace, where he places her in the Queen's bedroom. He then gives the Queen a nightmare that closely parallels actual events; because the BFG setting Sophie in her bedroom was part of the dream, the Queen believes her and speaks with the giant over breakfast. Fully convinced, she authorizes a task force to travel to the giants' homeland and secure them as they sleep. The BFG guides a fleet of helicopters to the sleeping giants. Eight are successfully shackled, but Fleshlumpeater awakes; Sophie and the BFG trick him into being tied up. Having collected the BFG's dream collection, the helicopters carry the giants back to England, where they are imprisoned in a massive pit.

Every country that the giants had visited in the past sends thanks and gifts to the BFG and Sophie, for whom residences are built in Windsor Great Park. Tourists come in huge numbers to watch the giants in the pit, who are now fed only on snozzcumbers; they receive an unexpected snack when three drunks manage to climb the safety fence one night and fall in. The BFG receives the official title of Royal Dream-Blower, and continues bestowing dreams upon children; he also learns to speak and write more intelligibly, writing a book identified as the novel itself, under another's name.

Characters
 Sophie: The imaginative, creative, nearsighted and kind-hearted protagonist of the story who becomes a brave international heroine. Named after Dahl's first grandchild, Sophie Dahl. Voiced by Amanda Root in the 1989 film and portrayed by Ruby Barnhill in the 2016 film.
 The BFG: A friendly 24-foot-tall giant who has superhuman hearing and immense speed. His primary occupation is the collection and distribution of good dreams to children. He also appears in another novel, Danny, the Champion of the World, in which he is introduced as a folkloric character. His name is an initialism of 'Big Friendly Giant'. Voiced by David Jason in the 1989 film and motion-captured by Mark Rylance in the 2016 film.
 The Queen: The British monarch. Firm, bold, and ladylike, she plays an important role in helping Sophie and the BFG. Voiced by Angela Thorne in the 1989 film and portrayed by Penelope Wilton in the 2016 film.
 Mary: The Queen's maid. Voiced by Mollie Sugden in the 1989 film and portrayed by Rebecca Hall in the 2016 film.
 Mr. Tibbs: The Queen's butler. Voiced by Frank Thornton in the 1989 film and portrayed by Rafe Spall in the 2016 film.
 Mrs. Clonkers: The unseen director of the orphanage in which Sophie lives at the start of the novel; described as cruel to her charges. Voiced by Myfanwy Talog in the 1989 film and portrayed by Marilyn Norry in the 2016 film.
 The Heads of the Army and the Air Force: Two bombastic officers answering to the Queen. Voiced by Michael Knowles and Ballard Berkeley in the 1989 film and portrayed by Chris Shields and Matt Frewer in the 2016 film.
 Nine Man-Eating Giants: Each man-eating giant is about 50-feet-tall and proportionately broad and powerful.  Their only clothes are skirt-like coverings around their waists. According to the BFG, the flavours of the humans that the man-eating giants dine on depends on their country of origin: Turks taste like turkey, Greeks are too greasy (and hence apparently no giant ever visits that country), people from Panama taste like hats, the Welsh taste like fish, people from Jersey taste like cardigans, and the Danes taste like dogs.
 The Fleshlumpeater: The leader of the nine man-eating giants and the largest and most horrible of the bunch. Shows no mercy for eating so many humans over the years, and is happy with what he has done and would continue it if he could. Voiced by Don Henderson in the 1989 film and motion-captured by Jemaine Clement in the 2016 film.
 The Bloodbottler: Second-in-command to the Fleshlumpeater and also the smartest of the bunch. He has a fondness for the taste of human blood. Voiced by Don Henderson in the 1989 film and motion-captured by Bill Hader in the 2016 film.
 The Manhugger: One of the nine man-eating giants. He is the tallest of the giants and also has extremely large hands compared to the rest of his body. He is notable for his black hair and the vest and shorts he wears.  Motion-captured by Adam Godley in the 2016 film.
 The Meatdripper: One of the nine man-eating giants. He pretends to be a tree in a park so that he can pick off the humans that go under him or families that stop to have a picnic underneath him. He has a Mohawk and a mustache and does not wear a shirt, just two handmade straps out of human materials. He wears red shorts and seems to be the cleanest of the giants. He also seems to care a lot more about hunting and being more serious than the rest.  Motion-captured by Paul Moniz de Sa in the 2016 film.
 The Childchewer: One of the nine man-eating giants. He is best friends with the Meatdripper in the story and also by the name, suggests he enjoys the taste of child most of all. He only wears one piece of clothing and has a long beard and gray hair. he also makes the most noise out of the giant men when he sleeps.   Motion-captured by Jonathan Holmes in the 2016 film.
 The Butcher Boy: The youngest of the nine man-eating giants. He wears a circus tent for clothes, and is the most immature of the giants. Motion-captured by Michael Adamthwaite in the 2016 film.
 The Maidmasher: One of the nine man-eating giants. The name suggests he likes to smash maidens, but it is never confirmed it could mean he smashes them with his teeth. He is one of the fatest of the giants and also wears pants. He has thin but slightly visible hair and seems to have put the most car into his outfit out of the giants.Motion-captured by Ólafur Darri Ólafsson in the 2016 film.
 The Bonecruncher: One of the nine man-eating giants who is known for crunching up two humans for dinner every night. He enjoys eating people from Turkey, making him the picky eater of the bunch, although he will go to other countries such as joining the other eight in a trip to England. He is bald and notable wears an overall looking outfit. He also seems to be the fatest of the giants. Motion-captured by Daniel Bacon in the 2016 film.
 The Gizzardgulper: One of the nine man-eating giants. He often lies above the rooftops of the cities to grab people walking down the streets. He wears a helmet and pants but no shirt which distinguishes him. In the film he road down a hill with cars that he put on his feet like a roller skate with Sophie inside of one of them. Motion-captured by Chris Gibbs in the 2016 film.

References in other Roald Dahl books
The BFG first appears as a story told to Danny by his father in Danny, the Champion of the World. The ending is almost the same as James and the Giant Peach, when he writes a story about himself, by himself.   Also, Mr. Tibbs relates to Mrs. Tibbs, the friend of Mr. Gilligrass, the U.S. president in Charlie and the Great Glass Elevator.

Awards and recognition
The BFG has won numerous awards including the 1985 Deutscher Jugendliteraturpreis as the year's best children's book, in its German translation Sophiechen und der Riese and the 1991 Read Alone and Read Aloud BILBY Awards from the Children's Book Council of Australia.

In 2003 it was ranked number 56 in The Big Read, a two-stage survey of the British public by the BBC to determine the "Nation's Best-loved Novel". The U.S. National Education Association listed The BFG among the "Teachers' Top 100 Books for Children" based on a 2007 online poll. In 2012, it was ranked number 88 among all-time children's novels in a survey published by School Library Journal, a monthly with primarily U.S. audience. It was the fourth of four books by Dahl among the Top 100, more than any other writer.

Editions

English
  (hardcover, 1982)
  (hardcover, 1982)
  (paperback, 1982)
  (hardcover, 1984)
  (paperback, 1984)
  (paperback, 1985)
  (hardcover, 1993)
  (hardcover, 1993)
  (paperback, 1998)
  (paperback, 1999)
  (paperback, 2001)
  (hardcover, 2002)
  /  (paperback, 2007)
  (audio CD read by Natasha Richardson)

Selected translations
  (De GVR, Dutch, 1983)
  (The BFG, Spanish, 1984)
  (Sophiechen und der Riese, German, 1984)
  (Le bon gros géant, French, 1984)
  ( (Japanese, 1985)
  (Il GGG, Italian, 1987)
  (Die GSR: die groot sagmoedige reus, Afrikaans, 1993)
  (, Korean, 1997)
  (Gjiganti i madh i mirë, Albanian, 199-)
  (, Chinese, 2000)
  (Yr CMM: yr èc èm èm, Welsh, 2003)
  (Uriașul cel príetenos, Romanian, 2005)
  (Wielkomilud, Polish, 2016)
  (De GFR, West Frisian, 2016)

Adaptations

Comic strip
Between 1986 and 1998, the novel was adapted into a newspaper comic by journalist Brian Lee and artist Bill Asprey. It was published in the Mail on Sunday and originally a straight adaptation, with scripts accepted by Roald Dahl himself. After a while the comic started following its own storylines and continued long after Dahl's death in 1990.

Stage play
The play was adapted for the stage by David Wood and premiered at the Wimbledon Theatre in 1991.

Films

1989 film 

On 25 December 1989, ITV broadcast an animated film based on the book and produced by Cosgrove Hall Films on television, with David Jason providing the voice of the BFG and Amanda Root as the voice of Sophie. The film was dedicated to animator George Jackson who worked on numerous Cosgrove Hall productions.

2016 film 

A theatrical live-action film adaptation was produced by Walt Disney Pictures, directed by Steven Spielberg, and starring Mark Rylance as the BFG, as well as Ruby Barnhill, Penelope Wilton, Jemaine Clement, Rebecca Hall, Rafe Spall, and Bill Hader. The film was released on 1 July 2016, to positive critical reception. However, the film was financially unsuccessful.

TV series
A TV series based on The BFG is being developed as part of Netflix's "animated series event", based on Roald Dahl's books.

References

1982 British novels
Children's books by Roald Dahl
Fiction about giants
BILBY Award-winning works
British children's novels
British fantasy novels
Novels by Roald Dahl
Novels set in London
Jonathan Cape books
Fictional giants
Self-reflexive novels
Cultural depictions of Elizabeth II
British novels adapted into films
British novels adapted into plays
Novels adapted into comics
1982 children's books
Literary characters introduced in 1982
Male characters in film
Male characters in literature
British children's books
Novels about dreams
Novels about nightmares